The Armeniac Theme (Armeniakoi [thema]), more properly the Theme of the Armeniacs (Greek: , thema Armeniakōi) was a Byzantine theme (a military-civilian province) located in northeastern Asia Minor (modern Turkey).

History
The Armeniac Theme was one of the four original themes, established sometime in the mid-7th century out of the territory of Lesser Armenia (also known as "Armenia Minor"). Although the mention of a "George, tourmarchēs of the Armeniacs" in 629, during the Persian campaigns of Emperor Heraclius (r. 610–641), may suggest the existence of the theme at such an early date, the first unambiguous reference to it in literary sources occurs during the revolt of its general, Saborios, in 667/668. It is next mentioned on a seal of 717/718. Together with the other themes, it was created from the remnants of one of the field armies of the old East Roman army following the disastrous defeats suffered during the first wave of the Muslim conquests, a process probably complete by the late 640s. Thus, the army of the magister militum per Armeniae (the "Armeniacs") was withdrawn and settled in the areas of Pontus, Paphlagonia and Cappadocia, giving its name to the region. 

The theme's capital was at Amaseia, and it was governed by a stratēgos, who ranked, together with the stratēgoi of the Anatolic and Thracesian themes, in the first tier of stratēgoi, drawing an annual salary of 40 gold pounds. In the 9th century, it fielded some 9,000 men and encompassed 17 fortresses. Its size and strategic importance on the Byzantine Empire's north-eastern frontier with the Muslims made its governor a powerful figure, and the theme's forces participated in several revolts in the 8th century. Consequently, in the 9th century it was broken up: the smaller provinces of Charsianon and Cappadocia were formed, first as kleisourai and later as full themes, along the border in the south and east, while in circa 819, the coastal themes of Paphlagonia and Chaldia were split off, followed later by the area of Koloneia (first under a doux, by 863 under a full strategos), leaving a rump Armeniac theme encompassing the western Pontus.

The theme remained in Byzantine hands until the late 11th century. In 1073, however, following the disastrous Battle of Manzikert, Frankish mercenaries under Roussel de Bailleul seized control and governed the region, until Byzantine authority was restored by future emperor Alexios Komnenos in 1075. Shortly after, the region was overrun by the Seljuk Turks, with only a few coastal forts holding out. The Komnenian emperors managed to recover the coastal regions for the Empire, but the Armeniac theme was not restored.

References

Sources

 

 

States and territories established in the 7th century
States and territories disestablished in the 1070s
Byzantine Anatolia
Themes of the Byzantine Empire